T&T Club Motijheel is an association football club from Motijheel, Bangladesh. The club is a team of Bangladesh Championship League but currently inactive in football activities. They last played in 2018–19 Bangladesh Championship League. After that season, they did not compete in any professional league. The club management withdrew their name from 2020–21 Bangladesh Championship League citing internal conflict in club management.

History
The club was established in 1962 by Pakistan Telegraph and Telephone Department (currently Bangladesh Telecommunications Company Limited) during East Pakistan era. 

The club house was vandalized by Rajakars during Bangladesh Liberation War.

References

Association football clubs established in 1962
Football clubs in Bangladesh
Sport in Bangladesh
Dhaka
1962 establishments in East Pakistan